Radical 95 or radical profound meaning "dark" or "" is one of the 23 Kangxi radicals (214 radicals in total) composed of 5 strokes.

In the Kangxi Dictionary, there are only six characters (out of 49,030) to be found under this radical. In addition, the final dot stroke of the character in the Kangxi Dictionary was omitted to avoid using the same character in Kangxi Emperor's name  (see naming taboo).

This radical is not used in Simplified Chinese dictionaries.

Evolution

Derived characters

Variant forms
There is a design nuance in different printing typefaces for this radical character, akin to the differences found in radical 亠 and 幺. Traditionally, the first stroke is a vertical dot in printing typefaces, and the two turning strokes are broken into two respectively to adapt to the carving of movable type systems, and usually there is a gap between the third and the fourth strokes. Currently, in both Simplified Chinese and Traditional Chinese, the first stroke becomes a slant dot, and the discontinuous turning strokes are merged into one to imitate its handwriting form, though the traditional printing form is still widely used in Traditional Chinese publication. The traditional form remains standard in modern Japanese and Korean printing typefaces.

The difference of the upper part 亠 applies to both printing typefaces and handwriting forms; The difference of the lower part 幺 exists only in printing typefaces, not in any handwriting form.

Literature

External links

Unihan Database - U+7384
Chinese Etymology
Chinese Text Project (character list)

095